Ocnophila is a genus of insects belonging to the family Diapheromeridae.

The species of this genus are found in Central America.

Species:

Ocnophila acanthonota 
Ocnophila aculeata 
Ocnophila armata

References

Phasmatodea
Phasmatodea families